Parliamentary elections were held in Sudan between 12 April and 2 May 1968. The election followed the resignation of a third of the members of the Assembly elected in 1965. The result was a victory for the new Democratic Unionist Party, formed by a merger of the National Unionist Party and the People's Democratic Party in December 1967 and led by President Ismail al-Azhari, which won 101 of the 218 seats. Voter turnout was 61.0%.

In contrast, since the last election the Umma Party had fractured, with competing wings being led by Sadiq al-Mahdi and Imam al-Hadi al-Mahdi. Whilst Sadiq's Umma party emerged as the stronger of the two wings, Sadiq actually lost his own seat in the election to a rival from the Imam wing. In total the various Umma party affiliates won some 827,289 votes, or 45.46% of the vote, compared to the 40.8% won by the DUP. The Umma affiliates won only 72 seats, in contrast to the 90 seats won at the previous election.

Results

References

Sudan
Elections in Sudan
1968 in Sudan
National Legislature (Sudan)
April 1968 events in Africa
May 1968 events in Africa